Kerri-Anne Kennerley (née Wright; born 22 September 1953) is an Australian television and radio presenter, actress and singer. She has more than 50 years in the industry, and is an inductee into the Logie Hall of Fame. Kennerley was a co-host on Network 10's Studio 10. She is currently due to star in Pippin at the Sydney Lyric Theatre as Pippin's grandmother, Berthe.

Career

Kennerley made her first television appearance in 1967 at the age of 14 on the children's shows The Channel Niners and Everybody's In on Brisbane's QTQ 9. After returning to Australia from the US in 1981 she landed the role of Melinda Burgess in TV series The Restless Years, a teen-oriented soap opera. She hosted the breakfast TV program Good Morning Australia on Network Ten for 11 years.

During the 1980s Kennerley performed as a singer, and released a self-titled album (Kerri-Anne) as well as a Christmas album in 1985.

Her cabaret singing style was parodied by singer and comedian Gina Riley on the TV comedy show Fast Forward. She appeared on the television show and later record album Andrew Denton's Musical Challenge with a rendition of the AC/DC song Dirty Deeds.

From 1996 until 1998, she was compere of the daytime-variety TV show Midday. Hosting duties on the show earned her three Gold Logie nominations. After Midday ended in late 1998, she joined the What's Cooking program in 1999. This role (and the program) only lasted a few months. Both Midday and What's Cooking aired on the Nine Network.

In 2001, she shifted to Network Ten to host the game shows Greed and Moment of Truth. Both flopped and lasted only a few episodes. In 2002, she returned to the Nine Network where she hosted Kerri-Anne (originally titled Mornings with Kerri-Anne).

Kennerley moved to the Seven Network in 2012, and appeared as a contestant on the network's program Dancing with the Stars. A planned prime-time program for the network was put on hold due to Kennerley's cancer battle, but appeared as a guest reporter on Sunday Night and as fill-in presenter for Kylie Gillies on The Morning Show.

In September 2013, Kennerley joined Foxtel to present the true crime series Behind Mansion Walls for the Crime & Investigation Network. The initial order is for 13 one-hour episodes. Kennerley has also been a guest panelist on Network Ten's The Project.

In 2016, Kennerley spoke out in support of Sonia Kruger who had suggested a ban on Muslims immigrating to Australia. Kruger was later found by the New South Wales Civil and Administrative Tribunal to have vilified Muslims.

In 2017, Kennerley made a cameo appearance as herself in the first episode of The War on Waste.

Kennerley is an advisor on the fourth season of The Celebrity Apprentice Australia.

In September 2018, it was announced that Kennerley will be joining Studio 10 as co-host.

During climate change demonstrations related to the Extinction Rebellion in October 2019, Kennerley suggested that people should run over the protesters with their cars as a solution to stopping the campaign from affecting traffic. Commenting on her show Studio 10, she said that, "No emergency services should help them, nobody should do anything, leave them there, and you just put little witch's hats around them or use them as speed bumps." She also said in the same segment that an alternative solution would be to starve them in prison.
 
In 2020, it was announced that Kennerley, was one of several Network Ten stars who would be made redundant because of network budget cuts, others include fellow Studio 10 personality and news presenter Natarsha Belling and long time weather presenter Tim Bailey.

Following her departure from Studio 10, Kennerley was cast in the featured role of Berthe in Pippin at the Sydney Lyric Theatre

In 2022 she performed in a celebrity tribute to Australian comedian and actor Paul Hogan, Roast of Paul Hogan, which was broadcast on Australia’s Seven Network.

Personal life
Kennerley was born Kerri-Anne Wright in Brisbane, Queensland, the daughter of a builder/hobby farmer. Along with her three siblings, she was raised in Brisbane's bay-side suburb of Sandgate. During her time in the US, she was married to record producer Jimmy Miller. She has said that he regularly subjected her to physical assaults. She sought support from friend John Kennerley, who helped her leave the abusive marriage.

In 1984, she married John Kennerley, who had two children from a previous marriage. In a 2006 interview in The Australian Women's Weekly, she revealed that they had tried to have children for many years, that she had a miscarriage 15 years ago, and would always regret not having children.

In June 2012, Kennerley revealed in an interview in New Idea magazine that she had breast cancer.

In 2013, she was elected to the board of Golf Australia.

In March 2016, her husband was paralysed after injuring his neck in a fall at Coffs Harbour. He died in February 2019, aged 78.

Kennerley lives in the Sydney suburb of Woollahra.

Awards and honours
Kennerley was nominated for the Gold Logie in 1997, 1998 and 1999 for her role as host of Midday. Kennerley was awarded a star on the Caloundra Walk of Stars in 1988, between Leo Sayer and Lucky Grills. In 2017, she was inducted into the Logie Hall of Fame. In 2018, her portrait appeared on a series of Australia Post stamps, as part of the "Legends of Television" series

TV and radio work
 The Restless Years (1981)
 Good Morning Australia (1981–1991)
 2UE Fill in Announcer (1992–1993)
 2CH Breakfast shift & CEO (1994–1995)
 GMA With Bert Newton (1995) (fill in host for Bert Newton)
 Monday To Friday (1995)
 Midday with Kerri-Anne (1996–1998)
 What's Cooking? (1999)
 Greed (2001)
 Moment of Truth (2001)
 Kerri-Anne at Midday, Radio Show – 2GB (2001)
 Kerri-Anne (formerly titled Mornings with Kerri-Anne) (Oct 2002 – Nov 2011)
 Behind Mansion Walls (2011–2013)
 The Celebrity Apprentice Australia (2015)
 Studio 10 (September 2018 – September 2020)

Controversies
In 2010, Kennerley caused controversy while discussing sexual assault allegations involving two Collingwood Football Club players, by referring to women who socialize with footballers as "strays" and for suggesting that "responsibility cuts both ways".

In 2019, Kennerley made controversial sweeping statements regarding the rape of Indigenous women and children in "the outback".

In 2019, Kennerley made an on-air comment to a young female reporter wearing a playsuit saying "Did you forget your pants today?", following it up with a comment to camera that was construed by commentators as shaming the reporter.

References

External links

 

1953 births
Australian game show hosts
Living people
Logie Award winners
Musicians from Brisbane
Audiobook narrators